Yuz Bashi (also Romanized as Yūz Bāshī; also known as Yoozbash Cha’i and Yūzmāshe) is a village in Shivanat Rural District, Afshar District, Khodabandeh County, Zanjan Province, Iran. At the 2006 census, its population was 85, in 19 families.

References 

Populated places in Khodabandeh County